Jack Chambers may refer to:

 Jack Chambers (linguist) (born 1938), Canadian linguist
 Jack Chambers (artist) (1931–1978), Canadian artist and filmmaker
 Jack Chambers (footballer) (1901–1983), Australian rules footballer
 Jack Chambers (choreographer) (born 1988), Australian dancer, singer, actor and choreographer
 Jack Chambers (politician) (born 1990), Irish Fianna Fáil politician

See also
 Jack Chambers Public School, an elementary school in London, Ontario
 John Chambers (disambiguation)
 Chambers (surname)